The Gap Puche Cabin is a log cabin near Jackson, Wyoming that is the last survivor of the early outfitting industry in Jackson Hole.  It was built c. 1929 at the junction of the Gros Ventre River and Crystal Creek by brothers-in-law Actor Nelson and Charlie Smith. Beginning in 1930 the property was used by John Wort and Steve Callaghan as a base camp for their hunting guide, or outfitting operation, and became known as "Wort's Hunting Camp". Callaghan's interest in the operation was bought by Billy Stilson around 1935, and bought out Wort by 1939. The cabin was moved in 1942 or 1943 to its present location.

In 1976 Stilson sold the outfitting business to Gap and Peg Puche, who continue to use the cabin as a base camp.

See also
Wort Hotel

References

External links
Gap Puche Cabin at the Wyoming State Historic Preservation Office

Houses on the National Register of Historic Places in Wyoming
Houses in Teton County, Wyoming
Log cabins in the United States
National Register of Historic Places in Teton County, Wyoming
Log buildings and structures on the National Register of Historic Places in Wyoming